Yellowfin bream, yellow bream, yellow sea bream, or yellowfin sea bream are the common names for several species of sea breams with very similar appearances:
Acanthopagrus australis (also known as surf bream, silver bream, black bream, and eastern black bream), marine and freshwater species from eastern Australia
Acanthopagrus berda (also known as goldsilk seabream, pikey bream, silver bream, black bream and picnic sea bream), marine species from the Indian Ocean
Acanthopagrus butcheri (also known as black bream, southern black bream, silver bream, golden bream, and southern yellowfin bream), marine and freshwater species from southern Australia
Acanthopagrus latus (also known as Japanese bream, West Australian bream, datina, and yellow-finned black porgy), marine species from East Asia, Southeast Asia, and Australia
Rhabdosargus sarba (also known as goldlined seabream, silver bream, and tarwhine), marine species from the Indo-West Pacific

See also
Black bream
Silver bream
Bream

Fish common names